Stejskal (feminine: Stejskalová) is a Czech surname. The name may refer to:

 Adam Stejskal (born 2002), Czech footballer
 František Stejskal (1895–1975), Czech athlete
 Igor Stejskal (born 1968), Czech volleyball player
 Jan Stejskal (born 1962), Czech football player
 Jiří Stejskal (born 1982), Czech ice hockey player
 Josef Stejskal (dramatist) (1897–1942), Czech theatre director
 Martin Stejskal (born 1944), Czech painter
 Michaela Stejskalová (born 1987), Czech basketball player

References

See also
 

Czech-language surnames